Venango County is a county in the Commonwealth of Pennsylvania. As of the 2020 census, the population was 50,454. Its county seat is Franklin. The county was created in 1800 and later organized in 1805.

Venango County comprises the Oil City, PA micropolitan statistical area. It is part of the Pittsburgh media market.

History

Shortly afterward, Rogers met oil pioneer Charles Pratt, who purchased the entire output of the tiny Wamsutta Oil Refinery. In 1867, Rogers joined Pratt in forming Charles Pratt and Company, which was purchased by Standard Oil in 1874. Rogers became one of the key men in John D. Rockefeller's Standard Oil Trust.
Venango County was created on March 12, 1800, from parts of Allegheny and Lycoming Counties. The name "Venango" is derived from the Native American name of the region, Onenge, meaning Otter. This was corrupted in English as the Venango River. The settlement at its mouth was likewise called Venango, which since March 3, 1871, has been the South Side of Oil City.

Venango County was home to an oil boom in the years following discovery of natural oil (petroleum) in the mid-1850s.

George Bissell, a Yale University chemistry professor, and Edwin L. Drake, a former railroad conductor, made the first successful use of a drilling rig on August 28, 1859, near Titusville. (Although Titusville is in Crawford County, the first oil well was drilled outside of town, less than a mile inside of the Venango County boundary) This single well soon exceeded the entire cumulative oil output of Europe since the 1650s. Within weeks, oil derricks were erected all over the area. Other oil boom towns located in Venango County included Franklin, Oil City, and the now defunct Pithole City. The principal product of the oil was kerosene.

McClintocksville was a small community in Cornplanter Township in Venango County. In 1861, it was the location of Wamsutta Oil Refinery, the first business venture of Henry Huttleston Rogers, who became a leading United States capitalist, businessman, industrialist, financier, and philanthropist. Rogers and his young wife Abbie Palmer Gifford Rogers lived in a one-room shack there along Oil Creek for several years beginning in 1862.

After joining Standard Oil, Rogers invested heavily in various industries, including copper, steel, mining, and railways. The Virginian Railway is widely considered his final life's achievement. Rogers amassed a great fortune, estimated at over $100 million, and became one of the wealthiest men in the United States. He was also a generous philanthropist, providing many public works for his hometown of Fairhaven, Massachusetts, and financially assisting helping such notables as Mark Twain, Helen Keller, and Dr. Booker T. Washington.

Perhaps in one of history's ironies, another resident of Venango County about the same time as Henry and Abbie Rogers was a little girl named Ida M. Tarbell, whose father was an independent producer whose small business was ruined by the South Improvement Company scheme of 1871 and the conglomerate which became Standard Oil. Introduced to each other in 1902 by their mutual friend  Twain, Tarbell, who had become an investigative journalist and Rogers, who knew of her work, shared meetings and information over a two-year period which led to her epoch work, The History of the Standard Oil Company, published in 1904, which many historians feel helped fuel public sentiment against the giant company and helped lead to the court-ordered break-up of it in 1911.

The oil heritage of Venango County is commemorated by a Pennsylvania State Park and many heritage sites which help tell the story and memorialize the people of the oil boom of the late 19th and early 20th centuries.

Geography

French Creek is formed near French Creek, New York and extends for a length of 117 miles (188 km) with a drainage area of 1,270 square miles (3,289 km2). It joins the Allegheny River near Franklin.  The watershed area includes parts of Erie, Crawford, Venango, and Mercer Counties in Pennsylvania as well as Chautauqua County, New York.

Adjacent counties
 Crawford County (northwest)
 Warren County (north)
 Forest County (northeast)
 Clarion County (east)
 Butler County (south)
 Mercer County (west)

Demographics

As of the census of 2000, there were 57,565 people, 22,747 households, and 15,922 families residing in the county.  The population density was 85 people per square mile (33/km2).  There were 26,904 housing units at an average density of 40 per square mile (15/km2).  The racial makeup of the county was 97.64% White, 1.09% Black or African American, 0.18% Native American, 0.23% Asian, 0.02% Pacific Islander, 0.17% from other races, and 0.67% from two or more races.  0.52% of the population were Hispanic or Latino of any race. 43.9% English or Welsh, 12.5% were of German, 11.1% American, 9.9% Irish, 8.3% Scotch-Irish, 2.8% Dutch, 2.1% Italian, and 1.6% French ancestry.

There were 22,747 households, out of which 30.40% had children under the age of 18 living with them, 55.80% were married couples living together, 9.90% had a female householder with no husband present, and 30.00% were non-families. 26.20% of all households were made up of individuals, and 12.50% had someone living alone who was 65 years of age or older.  The average household size was 2.45 and the average family size was 2.93.

In the county, the population was spread out, with 24.20% under the age of 18, 7.20% from 18 to 24, 26.70% from 25 to 44, 25.10% from 45 to 64, and 16.80% who were 65 years of age or older.  The median age was 40 years. For every 100 females there were 95.40 males.  For every 100 females age 18 and over, there were 92.10 males.

2020 Census

Micropolitan Statistical Area

The United States Office of Management and Budget has designated Venango County as the Oil City, PA Micropolitan Statistical Area (µSA). As of the 2010 U.S. Census the micropolitan area ranked 9th most populous in the State of Pennsylvania and the 182nd most populous in the United States with a population of 54,984.

Law and government

|}

Venango County has long been predominantly Republican. Only twice since the Civil War has the county selected a Democratic presidential candidate, and only Lyndon B. Johnson in his 1964 landslide has gained an absolute majority for the Democratic Party. In 1984, Venango County actually voted fractionally more Democratic than the nation at-large due to hostility towards Reaganomics in industrial districts, and in the 1992 and 1996 elections it came within two points and one point, respectively of voting for Democrat Bill Clinton, but by 2016 Donald Trump had gained 68.1 percent to Hillary Clinton's 26.8 percent – figures which were long typical of the county.

Voter Registration
As of February 21, 2022, there are 32,319 registered voters in Venango County 

 Democratic: 9,181 (28.41%)
 Republican: 18,864 (58.37%)
 Independent: 2,868 (8.87%)
 Third Party: 1,406 (4.35%)

County Commissioners
 Samuel H. Breene (Republican)
 Michael C. Dulaney (Republican)
 Albert "Chip" Abramovic (Democrat)

State Senate
 Scott Hutchinson, Republican, Pennsylvania Senate, District 21

State House of Representatives
 Lee James, Republican, Pennsylvania House of Representatives, District 64

United States House of Representatives
 G.T. Thompson, Republican, Pennsylvania's 15th congressional district

United States Senate
 Pat Toomey, Republican
 Bob Casey Jr., Democrat

Economy

Major employers
 Joy Mining Machinery
 Pennzoil
 Quaker State
Pennzoil and Quaker State left the Venango area for Texas. After leaving the area they merged and stopped refining oil. They now concentrate on retail oil and automotive additives produced for them by other companies. As of 2007, the two companies only exist as brand names after the company disappeared because of successive mergers.

With global crude oil prices touching US$100 in early 2008, long-dormant interest reawakened in Venango County's remaining oil reserves, 70% undrilled by one estimate.  High prices make less accessible oil deposits worth extracting.  For instance, a Canadian firm proposed drilling several large mines and allowing oil to flood the tunnels.

Education

Public school districts
 Cranberry Area School District
 Franklin Area School District
 Oil City Area School District
 Valley Grove School District

Partial districts
These public school districts are only partially in Venango County:
 Allegheny-Clarion Valley School District
 Forest Area School District
 Penncrest School District
 Titusville Area School District

Colleges and universities
 Clarion University, Venango Campus
 Dubois Business College (closed 2016)
 Penn State University Venango County Co-Op Extension

Transportation

Airport
 Venango Regional Airport

Major highways

Recreation

Pennsylvania State Parks and Forests
 Oil Creek State Park
 Cornplanter State Forest
 Clear Creek State Forest

Attractions and tourism
 DeBence Antique Music World
 Oil Region Astronomical Observatory
 Franklin Silver Cornet Band
 Franklin Public Library.  The Franklin Public Library was founded in 1894 and has had several homes, although its current location on Twelfth Street in Franklin, Venango County, PA has been its home since 1921.  The original structure on Twelfth Street was built in 1849 as a residence and required extensive renovations in 1921 to make it suitable for library use.

Communities

Under Pennsylvania law, there are four types of incorporated municipalities: cities, boroughs, townships, and, in at most two cases, towns. The following cities, boroughs and townships are located in Venango County:

Cities
 Franklin (county seat)
 Oil City

Boroughs

 Barkeyville
 Clintonville
 Cooperstown
 Emlenton (partly in Clarion County)
 Pleasantville
 Polk
 Rouseville
 Sugarcreek
 Utica

Townships

 Allegheny
 Canal
 Cherrytree
 Clinton
 Cornplanter
 Cranberry
 French Creek
 Irwin
 Jackson
 Mineral
 Oakland
 Oil Creek
 Pinegrove
 Plum
 President
 Richland
 Rockland
 Sandycreek
 Scrubgrass
 Victory

Census-designated places
Census-designated places are geographical areas designated by the U.S. Census Bureau for the purposes of compiling demographic data. They are not actual jurisdictions under Pennsylvania law. Other unincorporated communities, such as villages, may be listed here as well.

 Hannasville
 Hasson Heights
 Kennerdell
 Seneca
 Woodland Heights

Unincorporated communities
 Bredinsburg
 Cranberry
 Dempseytown
 Fertigs
 Petroleum Center
 Raymilton
 Siverly
 Venus

Population ranking
The population ranking of the following table is based on the 2010 census of Venango County.

† county seat

Notable people
 Orrin Dubbs Bleakley
 Cornplanter
 William Holmes Crosby Jr.
 Hildegarde Dolson
 Frank Evans
 Gabby Gabreski
 Leon H. Gavin
 Alexander Hays
 Kathryn Kuhlman
 Judge Robert Lamberton
 Ted Marchibroda
 Jesse L. Reno
 George C. Rickards
 Henry H. Rogers
 Joseph Sibley
 Peter Moore Speer
 Ida M. Tarbell
 John Wesley Van Dyke

See also
 Oil Creek Library District
 Oil Region

References

External links

Official county website

 

1800 establishments in Pennsylvania
Counties of Appalachia
Populated places established in 1800